Rajan Gurukkal (born 16 May 1948) is a leading Indian social scientist, historian, professor and writer. He has written many books and articles on different topics. He has also received awards for his works.

Gurukkal is generally considered as left-of-centre historian by political analysts.

Biography
Puthen Madathil Rajan Gurukkal was born on 15 May 1948 in a northern Kerala village called Kariyad near Mahe in the Kannur District of India. He did his schooling first in his family school at Kuruvattur in the Kozhikode District, and subsequently in Kariyad Nambiar's Upper Primary School and Ramavilasam Secondary School. Joined Government College, Madappally and Government Brennen College, Thalassery for his graduation. He received a postgraduate degree in history from the University of Calicut in 1972, with first class and first rank from the University, after which he took up teaching at the Union Christian College at Aluva in Kerala. Later he completed his MPhil in 1978 and PhD in 1985 in historical socio-economics from Jawaharlal Nehru University, New Delhi. Then became a faculty of Centre for Historical Studies, JNU 

He was a visiting faculty briefly at Humboldt University(1987) and at Ecole des Hautes Etudes en Sciences Sociale, Paris (2006) and lectured at several Universities in the country as well as abroad such as Humboldt, Leipzig, Berlin, Heidelberg, Tübingen and Ruhr (Germany); EHESS, Paris; and
CIRAD, Montpellier (France); Toronto and Kingston (Canada); Manchester, Glasgow, Reading, Westminster and SOAS (UK); Shanghai (China); Tokyo, Taisho
and Toyo Bunko (Japan); Central European University, Budapest (Hungary). He has worked on different and several important posts such as the dean of faculty, member of the academic council, senate and syndicate of a few universities and social science research institutes and others. Former Vice-Chancellor of Mahatma Gandhi University, Kottayam, India. He was Sundararajan Visiting Professor at the Centre for Contemporary Studies, Indian Institute of Science, Bangalore during 2012-2016. 
He currently serves as the Vice-Chairman of the Kerala State Higher Education Council.

Career
Gurukkal began his career as a junior lecturer at Union Christian College, Aluva in 1972 as soon as he finished his postgraduation. After completing his doctoral education, he joined as the teaching faculty at the Centre for Historical Studies of Jawaharlal Nehru University for some time before taking up the chair of Professor and Director, School of Social Sciences, Mahatma Gandhi University, Kottayam, Kerala in 1988. He took up the position at Mahatma Gandhi University upon the invitation of noted Kannada writer and the then University Vice-Chancellor U. R. Ananthamurthy.

Literary career
He has written five books in Malayalam and six books in English, on the topic of Socio-economic, cultural history of Kerala, structural anthropology, historical sociology, and human ecology of the Southern Western Ghats. He has about 150 research articles in the national and international Journals besides many articles in various magazines and newspapers on current issues.

Awards

 Teacher Fellowship. Indian Council of Historical Research. 1977
 National Teacher Fellowship. University Grants Commission. 1980
 Oravakkal Mathen Memorial Best Academician Award. 1986
 Braj Dev Prasad Memorial Prize for the best book on ancient Indian history, Rethinking Classical Indo-Roman Trade, OUP (2016)

Select Bibliography

 Aryanisation of South India Dravidian Encyclopaedia, Trivandrum, 1983
 From the Royalty of Icons to the Divinity of Royalty: Aspects of Vaisnava Icons and Kingship in South India in R. Parimoo ed. Vaisnavism and Indian Art, Baroda, 1984.
 State and Society in South India 200 B.C to 300 A.D, History of India: Earliest Times to 800 A.D Indira Gandhi Open University. New Delhi. 1990.
 Early Social Formation of South India and Its Transitional Processes, in H.V. Sreenivasa Murthy, B. Surendra Rao, Kesavan Veluthat and S.A.Bari eds.
 Formation of Caste Society in Kerala : Historical Antecedents in K.L.Sharma ed. Caste and Class in Indian States, Delhi, 1994
 Towards a New Discourse: Discursive Processes in Early South India, in R. Champakalakshmi and S. Gopal (Eds.) 
 Ideology, Essays in Honour of Romila Thapar, New Delhi, 1996.
 Recent Historiographic Dimensions on Early South Indian Socio-economics, in K.K.N.Kurup ed. New Dimensions in South Indian History
 Historical Materialism and History, in T.R. Venugopalan Ed. History and Theory, Government College Publications, Thrissur
 Social Formation in Iron Age South India, K. Surendra Rao and Kesavan Veluthat (Eds) Sheik Ali Felicitation Volume, Mangalore 2000. 
 (and about 150 research articles in various national and international journals).

Monographs & Books

 Levi-Strauss (Monograph in Malayalam), Viswadarsana publications, Trissur, 1986.
 History of Kerala, (book in Malayalam, jointly done with Raghava Varier) Vallathol Vidyapitham, Edappal, 1991.
 The Kerala Temple and the Early Medieval Agrarian System, Vallathol Vidyapitham, Edappal, 1992.
 Myth and Society (book in Malayalam, jointly done with Raghava Varier, Jalakam Publishers, Perambra, Kozhikode. 1994
 Cultural History of Kerala, vol. I. Department of Cultural Publications, Thiruvananthapuram, 1999.
 Kerala Charithram 2 Vols (Book in Malayalam), jointly done with Raghava Varier) Vallathol Vidyapitham, 2012 
 Forest Landscapes of the Southern Western Ghats, India jointly edited with B. Ramesh, French Institute, Pondicherry, 2007
 Social Formations of Early South India, OUP, 2009.
 Myth Charithram Samuham (book in Malayalam), SPCS, 2013
 Suice Trends in Kerala: Causes and Allevaiations, Monograph, Stat Planning Board, 2010
 Rethinking Classical Indo-Roman Trade: Political Economy of Eastern Mediterranean Exchange Relations, OUP 2016
 History and Theory of Knowledge Production: An Introductory Outline, OUP 2018
 History of Kerala: Pre-historic to the Present, jointly done with Raghava Varier, Orient Blackswan, 2018

Projects
 Making of Modern Kerala, UGC Major Research Project, 1999–2001.
 Ford Foundation Project on Historical Atlas of South India, in collaboration with the French Institute, Pondicherry (2006 April – 2008 April).
 Fringe Area Socioeconomic Study of the Periyar Tiger Reserve, World Bank Project (IEDP, 2002–03).
 Socio-economic Sustainability Study, Periyar Tiger Reserve, World Bank Project  (IEDP, 2003).
 Sabarimala Enclave: Pilgrim Impact Assessment, Periyar Tiger Reserve, World  Bank Project (IEDP, 2002–03).
 Process Documentation Research, Periyar Tiger Reserve, World Bank Project  (IEDP, 2003–04)

See also
List of Indian writers

References

External links
 Scholars come out in support of Professor Rajan Gurukkal
  Re-politicise society: Rajan Gurukkal

1948 births
Living people
20th-century Indian social scientists
Writers from Kerala
University of Calicut alumni
Academic staff of the Indian Institute of Science
Heads of universities and colleges in India
People from Kannur district
Scholars from Kerala
Indian social sciences writers
Historians of Kerala